The following is a list of Roller Hockey International (RHI) arenas.

Defunct teams

See also
Roller Hockey International
List of U.S. stadiums by capacity

References

Roller Hockey International
Roller Hockey International